Mikael Rönnberg (born 6 February 1957) is a retired footballer who played as a midfielder for several Swedish clubs, mostly for Hammarby IF, and the Greek club Larissa F.C.

Personal life
He is the brother of fellow footballer Glenn Rönnberg.

International career
Rönnberg represented Sweden from 1979 to 1981 for 6 times and scored his only international goal against Norway in a 4–2 victory in February 1981.

References

1957 births
Living people
Swedish footballers
Hammarby Fotboll players
Malmö FF players
Dallas Sidekicks (1984–2004) players
Gefle IF players
Trelleborgs FF players
Athlitiki Enosi Larissa F.C. players
Association football midfielders
Swedish expatriate footballers
Expatriate soccer players in the United States
Swedish expatriate sportspeople in the United States
Expatriate footballers in Greece
Swedish expatriate sportspeople in Greece
Sweden international footballers
Footballers from Stockholm